The Tom Bamford Lancaster Classic was a professional road bicycle race held in late May or early June between 1992 and 2007 in Lancaster, Pennsylvania, USA. Due to the "short, winding hills," it had a very low attrition rate, with 37% of starters finishing the race on average. 2003's 14% attrition was lower than that of the 2021 Tour de France, in which 23% of starters finished.

History
The race was established in part by Lancaster mayor Janice Stork, along with sponsor CoreStates Financial Corporation (and its acquisitions, Hamilton Bank, First Union, and Wachovia National Bank), in an attempt to revitalize the downtown area.

The race underwent several name changes:
 CoreStates Hamilton Classic (1992-1996)
 CoreStates Invitational (1997)
 First Union Invitational (1998-2002)
 Wachovia Lancaster Invitational (2003-2005)
 Commerce Bank Tom Bamford Lancaster Classic (2006-2007)
 Named in memory of a late CoreStates Hamilton Bank executive.

It was part of the following tours:
 ICP Tour of America (1993-1996)
 CoreStates USPRO Cycling Championship (1997)
 First Union Cycling Series (1998-2002)
 USPRO Saturn Tour (1999-2000)
 USPRO Championship (2001)
 Wachovia Cycling Series (2003-2005)
 Wachovia USPRO Championship (2004-2005)
 Commerce Bank Triple Crown of Cycling (first leg) (2006) 
 UCI America (2006)
 US Cycling Pro Tour (2007)

The Lancaster Classic ended abruptly after the 2007 event and was replaced by the Lehigh Valley Classic in nearby Allentown.

Winners

Men's

Women's

Amateur men's

References

Sports in Lancaster, Pennsylvania
Cycle races in the United States
Recurring sporting events established in 1992
1992 establishments in Pennsylvania
UCI America Tour races
2007 disestablishments in Pennsylvania
Men's road bicycle races
Road bicycle races
Defunct cycling races in the United States
Sports competitions in Pennsylvania